Johan Brunström and Frederik Nielsen won the title, defeating Sekou Bangoura and Matt Seeberger in the final 6–1, 6–2 .

Seeds

Draw

Draw

References
 Main Draw
 Qualifying Draw

Knoxville Challenger – Doubles
Knoxville Challenger